Tungnafellsjökull ("Tungna-fells glacier" or "tongue-fells glacier") is a glacier and volcano in Iceland.

References
Volcano Discovery

External links 
 Tungnafellsjökull in the Catalogue of Icelandic Volcanoes
 

Glaciers of Iceland
Volcanoes of Iceland
Mid-Iceland Belt
Subglacial volcanoes of Iceland